Kongkeshu Township is an rural township in Sangzhi County, Zhangjiajie, Hunan Province, China.

Administrative division
The township is divided into 14 villages, the following areas: Miaoyu Village, Huxing Village, Chenjiaping Village, Longhushan Village, Qiaoziyu Village, Shijiawan Village, Kongjun Village, Liufangya Village, Lianhuatai Village, Tudiya Village, Luojiaping Village, Baimaquan Village, Ranjiaping Village, and Tangxiyu Village (庙峪村、虎形村、陈家坪村、龙虎山村、桥子峪村、石家湾村、空军村、六方亚村、莲花台村、土地亚村、罗家坪村、白马泉村、冉家坪村、汤溪峪村).

References

External links

Divisions of Sangzhi County